13 Vulpeculae is a blue giant with a stellar classification of class B9.5III in the northern constellation Vulpecula. It is visible to the naked eye as a faint, blue-white hued star with an apparent visual magnitude of 4.57 and it is approximately 339 light years away from the Sun based on parallax. The star is radiating 180 times the luminosity of the Sun from its photosphere at an effective temperature of 8,801 K.

The system is moving closer to the Earth with a heliocentric radial velocity of −28 km/s.

References

External links
 

B-type giants
Binary stars
Vulpecula
Durchmusterung objects
Vulpeculae, 13
188260
097886
7592